John Kenneth Spain (October 6, 1946  – October 11, 1990) was an American professional basketball player.

Spain was selected by the National Basketball Association's Chicago Bulls with the 20th overall pick in the 1969 NBA Draft and by the Oakland Oaks in the 1969 ABA Draft. He played in eleven American Basketball Association games during the 1970-71 season for the Pittsburgh Condors.

A 6'9" center, Spain played college basketball at the University of Houston with Elvin Hayes from 1966-1969. Spain graduated from Austin High School in Houston.

Spain died of cancer at age 44 in Houston, Texas.

References

External links
 
Career NBA stats @ basketball-reference.com
Career NCAA stats @ thedraftreview.com

1946 births
1990 deaths
American men's basketball players
Basketball players at the 1968 Summer Olympics
Basketball players from Houston
Centers (basketball)
Chicago Bulls draft picks
Delaware Blue Bombers players
Houston Cougars men's basketball players
Medalists at the 1968 Summer Olympics
Oakland Oaks draft picks
Olympic gold medalists for the United States in basketball
Parade High School All-Americans (boys' basketball)
Pittsburgh Condors players
United States men's national basketball team players
Wilmington Blue Bombers players